Finn on the Fly is 2008 Canadian film that was directed by Mark Jean. The Canadian comedian Ryan Belleville plays the part of Finn as a human.

In the film, Dr. Madsen, a bitter, fame-hungry mad scientist (Ana Gasteyer), turns a Boy named Ben's dog, Finn, into a human (Ryan Belleville), when Finn accidentally runs into her lab. Ben trains Finn on how to act like a human, while Dr. Madsen wants to capture Finn for personal gain.

Cast
 Ryan Belleville as Finn
 Eddie the Dog as Finn the Dog
 Matthew Knight as Ben Soledad, Finn's owner
 Ana Gasteyer as Dr. Madsen
 Brandon Firla as Bob, Dr. Madsen's assistant
 Wendy Anderson as Grace Soledad, Ben's mother
 Juan Chioran as Pablo Reyes, Ben's stepfather
 David Milchard as Eddie Reyes, Ben's paternal step-cousin
 Aislinn Paul as Chloe, Ben's love interest
 Mathew Peart as Al Madsen, Dr. Madsen's son and Ben's bully later best friend
 Vivien Endicott Douglas as Ashley, Ben's best friend
 Cameron Ansell as Nelson, Ben's best friend
 Shannon Anderson as Ruby, Ben's best friend and Nelson's love interest
 Kristian Ferguson as Ralph, Ben's best friend

Special features on the DVD are behind the scenes and a short comic. The film was released in the 2 DVD set Dog Tails Collection along with A Dog of Flanders, A Dog's Tale, and Sounder.

Common Sense Media gave the film a positive review.

References

2008 films
Canadian comedy films
English-language Canadian films
Films about dogs
Films about shapeshifting
Films directed by Mark Jean
Films scored by Jeff Danna
2000s English-language films
2000s Canadian films